Formicdubius is a genus of Scarabaeidae (scarab beetles) in the superfamily Scarabaeoidea.

References

Scarabaeidae